is a Japanese football player.

Playing career
Kano was born in Shizuoka Prefecture on October 31, 1994. After graduating from Kokushikan University, he joined Japan Football League club Tochigi Uva FC in 2017. In 2018, he moved to J3 League club SC Sagamihara.

Club statistics
Updated to 22 February 2020.

References

External links

1994 births
Living people
Kokushikan University alumni
Association football people from Shizuoka Prefecture
Japanese footballers
J3 League players
Japan Football League players
Tochigi City FC players
SC Sagamihara players
Arterivo Wakayama players
Association football defenders